Lomba is a settlement in the northwestern part of the island of Fogo, Cape Verde. In 2010 its population was 731. It is situated 10 km northeast of the island capital São Filipe.

See also
List of villages and settlements in Cape Verde

References

Villages and settlements in Fogo, Cape Verde
São Filipe, Cape Verde